Norm Miller (October 28, 1917 – July 14, 2005) was an American sportswriter best known as the New York Giants beat writer for the New York Daily News. He was awarded the Dick McCann Memorial Award by the Pro Football Hall of Fame in 1981.

References

Sportswriters from New York (state)
1917 births
2005 deaths
20th-century American journalists
American male journalists